Paul L. "Sparky" Adams (April 5, 1921 – July 4, 1986) was an American football, cross country running, and track and field coach. He served as the head football coach at Baldwin–Wallace College—now known at Baldwin Wallace University—in Berea, Ohio from 1954 to 1957, compiling a record of 8–25–1. In 1958, he stepped down to become an assistant football coach, so he could focus his roles as the head cross country and track coach at Baldwin–Wallace, positions that he held until his retirement in 1983. Adams was also and assistant basketball coach and a swimming coach at Baldwin–Wallace. 

A native of Newark, Ohio, Adams attended Baldwin–Wallace, where he lettered in football, basketball, and track, before graduating in 1943. He served in Third Army of the United States Army, led by Gernal George S. Patton, during World War II, earning a Purple Heart before his discharge in 1945.

Adams died at the age of 65, on July 4, 1986, of an apparent heart attack while on vacation in Miller Lake, Ontario.

Head coaching record

Football

References

Place of birth missing
1921 births
1986 deaths
American football quarterbacks
Guards (basketball)
Baldwin Wallace Yellow Jackets football coaches
Baldwin Wallace Yellow Jackets football players
Baldwin Wallace Yellow Jackets men's basketball coaches
Baldwin Wallace Yellow Jackets men's basketball players
Basketball coaches from Ohio
Muskingum Fighting Muskies football coaches
Muskingum Fighting Muskies men's basketball coaches
College cross country coaches in the United States
College swimming coaches in the United States
College tennis coaches in the United States
College track and field coaches in the United States
United States Army personnel of World War II
People from Newark, Ohio
Coaches of American football from Ohio
Players of American football from Ohio
Basketball players from Ohio
Track and field athletes from Ohio